The Trombone Concerto is a concerto for trombone and orchestra by the American composer Christopher Rouse.  The work was commissioned by the New York Philharmonic for its principal trombonist Joseph Alessi.  It was completed on April 5, 1991, and was first performed by Alessi and the New York Philharmonic conducted by Leonard Slatkin on December 30, 1992, in Avery Fisher Hall, New York City.  The concerto is dedicated to the composer and conductor Leonard Bernstein, who died suddenly October 14, 1990.  In 1993, the work was awarded the Pulitzer Prize for Music.

Composition
The concerto, lasting approximately half an hour in performance, is written in three movements played without pause:
Adagio
Scherzo
Adagio

The third movement, which Rouse especially intended as a tribute to Bernstein, quotes a theme from Bernstein's Symphony No. 3, Kaddish.  On dedicating the concerto to Bernstein, Rouse wrote:

Instrumentation
The concerto is scored for a solo trombone and orchestra, comprising two bassoons, contrabassoon, four French horns, three trumpets, three trombones, tuba, harp, timpani, xylophone, glockenspiel, chimes, marimba, two suspended cymbals, snare drum, tenor drum, five tom-toms, two bongo drums, bass drum, a pair of crash cymbals, two tamtams, and strings (violins I & II, violas, violoncellos, and double basses).

Reception
Edward Rothstein of The New York Times called the concerto "an obsessive work" and praised it as "distinctive, unsettling, yet structurally clear."  Gramophone also praised the piece, likening it to the music of Mahler, Copland, and Shostakovich, and lauded it as "pack[ing] a formidable punch."  Christopher Mowat of BBC Music Magazine commended the work, further noting:

Recordings 
 An American Celebration, Vol. 2 (New York Philharmonic Special Editions) – 2000 
 Joseph Alessi, trombone; New York Philharmonic; Leonard Slatkin, conductor (live recording).
 American Trombone Concertos, Vol. 2 (BIS-CD-788) – 1996 
 Christian Lindberg, trombone; BBC National Orchestra of Wales; Grant Llewellyn, conductor.
 Christopher Rouse: Gorgon (RCA 09026-68410-2) – 1997 
 Joseph Alessi, trombone; Colorado Symphony Orchestra; Marin Alsop, conductor.

References

Concertos by Christopher Rouse
1991 compositions
Rouse
20th-century classical music
Pulitzer Prize for Music-winning works
Music commissioned by the New York Philharmonic